Daniel Antonio Briceño Jalabert (born 2 March 1982) is a Chilean former professional footballer who played as a midfielder

Honours

Player
Curicó Unido
 Tercera División de Chile: 2005

Unión San Felipe
 Primera B: 2009
 Copa Chile: 2009

External links
 
 

1982 births
Living people
Chilean footballers
Association football midfielders
Unión La Calera footballers
Unión San Felipe footballers
Curicó Unido footballers
San Marcos de Arica footballers
Ñublense footballers
Chilean Primera División players
Primera B de Chile players
People from Curicó